Pat Cunningham (22 May 1914 – 17 February 2005) was an  Australian rules footballer who played with St Kilda in the Victorian Football League (VFL).

Notes

External links 

1914 births
2005 deaths
Australian rules footballers from Victoria (Australia)
St Kilda Football Club players